Ivan Semykin (born 4 June 1997) is a Ukrainian sprint canoeist. He is World champion in the K-4 500 m event. At the 2017 European championships in Plovdiv, Bulgaria, he finished third in pair with Ihor Trunov in K-2 500 m. Later he was stripped of that medal because of failed drug test by Trunov.

References

External links

Ukrainian male canoeists
Living people
People from Obukhiv
1997 births
ICF Canoe Sprint World Championships medalists in kayak
Sportspeople from Kyiv Oblast
21st-century Ukrainian people